Serdzong Monastery is a Buddhist monastery in Qinghai, China.

Buddhist monasteries in Qinghai
Tibetan Buddhist monasteries